The Archdeacon of Plymouth is a senior clergy position in the Church of England Diocese of Exeter and is responsible for the supervision of the clergy within the five rural deaneries: Ivybridge, Plymouth Moorside, Plymouth Devonport, Plymouth Sutton and Tavistock.

The archdeaconry was created by an Order-in-Council splitting the Archdeaconry of Totnes on 22 March 1918. The current archdeacon is Nick Shutt.

List of archdeacons
19181920 (res.): Arthur Perowne
192128 April 1928 (d.): Ernest Newman
19281950 (ret.): Whitfield Daukes (also Bishop suffragan of Plymouth from 1934)
19501962 (ret.): Norman Clarke, Bishop suffragan of Plymouth
19621978 (res.): Frederick Matthews (afterwards archdeacon emeritus)
19781982 (res.): Kenneth Newing (became Bishop suffragan of Plymouth)
19822000 (ret.): Robin Ellis
20012010 (ret.): Tony Wilds
201031 December 2018 (ret.): Ian Chandler (on leave during 2018)
18 June 2019present: Nick Shutt (Acting since 2018)

References